General elections were held in Greenland on 24 April 2018, electing all 31 members of Parliament. The elections were required to be held no later than 26 November 2018, four years after the previous elections on 27 November 2014, but Prime Minister Kim Kielsen chose to call the elections seven months early. His Siumut party remained the largest in Parliament, but lost two seats, whilst Inuit Ataqatigiit, the second-largest party, lost three seats. The smaller Democrats and Partii Naleraq gained seats, with the newly formed Cooperation Party and Nunatta Qitornai parties both entering Parliament.

Background
The 2014 general elections saw Siumut receive a narrow plurality of the vote, but win the same number of seats as Inuit Ataqatigiit (11). A coalition government was formed by Siumut, Democrats and Atassut which lasted until 2016, when Siumut formed a new coalition with Inuit Ataqatigiit and Partii Naleraq. Kim Kielsen from Siumut has led both governments.

During the 2014–2018 parliamentary term, both Atassut MPs defected to Simumut, while Michael Rosing left the Democrats to sit as an Independent.

Electoral system
The 31 members of Parliament are elected by proportional representation in multi-member constituencies. Seats are allocated using the d'Hondt method.

New parties
Two new parties contested the elections, the unionist and socially liberal Cooperation Party (Suleqatigiissitsisut) founded by Michael Rosing, and the pro-independence Nunatta Qitornai (Descendants of Our Country) founded by former Minister of Finance and Interior, Minister of Industry, Labour, Trade, Tourism, Energy and Foreign Affairs and Minister of Finance, Minerals and Foreign Affairs  Vittus Qujaukitsoq after a dispute over the government's approach toward Denmark. He eventually left Siumut following an unsuccessful leadership challenge to Kim Kielsen.

Opinion polls

Results

References

External links
General Election Results Qinersineq

Elections in Greenland
2018 in Greenland
Greenland